Mosannona pachiteae is a species of plant within the Annonaceae family. It is endemic to Peru.

References

Annonaceae
Vulnerable plants
Endemic flora of Peru
Taxonomy articles created by Polbot